Shri Jagannath Sanskrit Vishvavidayalaya, also known as Shri Jagannath Sanskrit University, is located in Puri, Odisha, India. It was established to promote Sanskrit Language and named after Lord Shri Jagannath in Puri. It was established by the then Chief Minister of Odisha Prajnana Vachaspati Sj. Janaki Ballabh Pattanayak, an eminent scholar of Sanskrit, who laid down the foundation stone at 9 A.M on 7.7.1981 at a spot of Mouza Balukhand.

References

External links

Department of Higher Education, Odisha
Sanskrit universities in India
Universities in Odisha
Puri
Educational institutions established in 1981
1981 establishments in Orissa